The 1988 Pro Bowl was the NFL's 38th annual all-star game which featured the outstanding performers from the 1987 season. The game was played on Sunday, February 7, 1988, at Aloha Stadium in Honolulu, Hawaii before a crowd of 50,113. The final score was AFC 15, NFC 6.

Marty Schottenheimer of the Cleveland Browns led the AFC team against an NFC team coached by Minnesota Vikings head coach Jerry Burns. The referee was Dick Hantak.

Bruce Smith of the Buffalo Bills was named the game's MVP. Players on the winning AFC team received $10,000 apiece while the NFC participants each took home $5,000.

AFC roster
The players representing the AFC were:

Offense

Defense

Special teams

NFC roster
The players representing the NFC were:

Offense

Defense

Special teams

References

External links

Pro Bowl
Pro Bowl
Pro Bowl
Pro Bowl
Pro Bowl
American football competitions in Honolulu
Pro Bowl